Paul Andrew Flaherty (March 14, 1964 – March 16, 2006) was an American computer scientist. He was a renowned specialist in Internet protocols and the inventor of the AltaVista search engine.

Biography
Flaherty was born in Milwaukee, Wisconsin.  He received his bachelor's degree in electrical engineering and mathematics from Marquette University, and his master's degree and PhD in electrical engineering from Stanford University.

He joined Digital Equipment Corporation in 1994 and, as the Associated Press wrote:

He held an amateur radio Extra class license with the call sign N9FZX.  Was President, W6YX, Stanford Amateur Radio Club, 1986-1990.

Station Engineer, W6YX, Stanford Amateur Radio Club, 1990-1994.
Started the VHF+ mailing list in 1989.
Married to his Stanford University sweetheart N6YBV (this number refers to her amateur radio call sign).
An avid railfan photographer and past Assistant General Manager of the Niles Canyon Railway.
Member of the Marquette chapter of Triangle Fraternity as an undergrad, where he served as chapter President. He exercised his duties with honor and was well liked within the fraternity.
Member of the Sunnyvale Rod and Gun Club where he enjoyed target shooting and trap shooting.
While a grad student drove a 1979 Z28 Camaro with T-tops.

At age 42, Flaherty died of a heart attack at his home in Belmont, California.

References

1964 births
2006 deaths
Scientists from Milwaukee
Amateur radio people
Marquette University alumni
Stanford University School of Engineering alumni
People from Belmont, California
Digital Equipment Corporation people